A by-election was held on 24 July 2021 for the Queensland Legislative Assembly seat of Stretton following the death of Duncan Pegg.

Background

Duncan Pegg was first elected at the 2015 election defeating incumbent Freya Ostapovitch on a swing of over 14%. Ostapovitch had won the previously safe seat for Labor during the Liberal National Party of Queensland landslide of the 2012 election. In subsequent elections, Pegg would increase the margin of Stretton back into safe territory for Labor and saw a nearly 5% swing to himself in the 2020 election. On 22 April 2021, Pegg announced that he would be resigning from his seat to focus on his health revealing that he had been diagnosed with cancer in 2019 and that it was a terminal illness. Pegg's death was announced by his electorate office on 10 June 2021.

Key dates

Candidates

Results

See also 

 List of Queensland state by-elections
 Politics of Queensland

References

External links

Stretton By-election – Electoral Commission Queensland
Stretton by-election 2021 – ABC Elections
Stretton by-election 2021 – The Tally Room

2021 Stretton state by-election
2021 elections in Australia